The Montreal Light, Heat and Power Company (MLH&P) was a utility company operating the electric and gas distribution monopoly in the area of Montreal, Quebec, Canada, until its nationalization by the government of Quebec in 1944, under a law creating the Quebec Hydroelectric Commission, also known as Hydro-Québec.

Hydro-Québec ran both of MLH&P's electric and gas operations until 1957, when its gas properties were sold to the Corporation de gaz naturel du Québec, known today as Énergir.

The company was established in 1901 as a result of the merger of Rodolphe Forget's Royal Electric Company and Herbert Samuel Holt's Montreal Gas Company. Its name became Montreal Light, Heat and Power Consolidated in 1918 after a merger and corporate reorganization.

Gallery

See also 

 History of Hydro-Québec
 Shawinigan Water & Power Company

References

External links 

Defunct companies of Quebec
Hydro-Québec
Natural gas companies of Canada
Companies based in Montreal
Energy companies established in 1901
Non-renewable resource companies established in 1901
Energy companies disestablished in 1944
1901 establishments in Quebec
1944 disestablishments in Quebec
Canadian companies established in 1901
Defunct energy companies of Canada